Arnaut may refer to:

Arnaut, Ottoman term for an Albanian
Arnaut (given name)

See also 
 Arnaout, a surname